Sam Jones Expressway (formerly the Airport Expressway and casually the Raymond Street Expressway) is a 4-lane divided highway with partial access control (urban expressway) in the city of Indianapolis. Since November 11, 2008, the new passenger terminal is accessed via exit 68 on I-70 much further south.

Routing

The eastern end of the Sam Jones Expressway is at the signalized intersection of South Tibbs Avenue and Raymond Street. East of that intersection the road is named Raymond Street. The western endpoint is a signalized "T" intersection on the grounds of the Indianapolis International Airport, at what was the main entrance to the now-demolished former passenger terminal. Between these two points are traffic interchanges with I-70 (partial), Lynhurst Drive (full), Executive Drive (partial), and I-465/I-74 (full). There is also a grade separation at Roena Street. The road serves pre-move airport hotels based by the old terminal site that remain open and use I-465 and I-70 or High School/Perimeter Road to provide private shuttle service to the new terminal.

Legal status

The Sam Jones Expressway is not an Interstate Highway, nor is it signed as a U.S. or state highway. It exists as a sub-standard freeway only between I-465 and I-70. It is properly named and classified as an expressway because it contains stoplights east of I-70 and west of Executive Drive; as well as a now-removed at-grade railroad crossing just east of its interchange with I-70.

Renaming

The opening of the Col. H. Weir Cook Terminal at the Indianapolis International Airport on November 11, 2008, meant the Sam Jones Expressway would no longer be a direct route for reaching the airport terminal. This prompted the city to rename the Airport Expressway as the Sam Jones Expressway in June 2007, in honor of civil rights leader Sam Jones, the founder and president of the city's Urban League from 1966 until 2002.

Major intersections

References

External links 
Map (via Google Maps) showing the Sam Jones Expressway and the Indianapolis International Airport

Freeways in the United States
Streets in Indianapolis